Saatchya Aat Gharat is a 2004 Indian Marathi-language film released on 31 May 2004. The film is directed by Sanjay Surkar and produced by Smita Talwalkar. It is partly based upon a 2002 incident in the University of Pune campus when a student was raped by someone posing as a policeman. This was the debut movie for Kartika Rane in Marathi film Industry.

Cast
The movie stars Kartika Rane, Manav Kaul, Nishikant Kamat, Benika Bisht, Mrunmayee Lagoo, Amruta Patki, Vibhavari Deshpande, Makarand Anaspure, Rakhi Sawant, Neena Kulkarni, Deepa Limaye, Suhas Joshi, Smita Talwalkar, Bharti Achrekar, Deepa Lagu, Prasanna Ketkar, Dr. Damle, Sharad Avasthi, Dr. Girish Oak, Nilu Phule, and Uday Tikekar.

Below are the details of main cast for Saatchya Aat Gharat.
Vibhawari Deshpande as Ketaki
Makarand Anaspure as Yuvraj
Bharat Ganeshpure as Advocate
Reema Lagoo as Narrator
Kartika Rane  as Madhura
Bharati Achrekar as Piyu's Mother
Suhas Joshi as Madhura's Aaji
Neena Kulkarni  as Madhura's  Mother
Deepa Limaye as Madhura's  Sister Meera
Uday Tikekar  as Madhura's  Father
Manav Kaul as Venky
 Benika Bisht as Nandini 
Nishikant Kamat  as Aniket
Mrunmayi Lagoo as Tejal
Dr. Girish Oak   as Ketaki's Father
Amruta Patki  as Piyu
Nilu Phule  as Yuvraj's Grandfather 
Rakhi Sawant as item girl in "Hil Pori Hila"
Prasann Ketkar  as Inspector Parab
Shriram Pendse  as Aniket's Uncle

Credits
The film's opening credits list the following filming locations: 
 Symbiosys InfoPark College
 Deccan Gymkhana, Talwalkar Gym
 Law College
 Sams Garden
 Agarwal Bungalow 
 Mokashi Bungalow
 V I T College Hostel 
 Kavi Bar
 Film and Television Institute of India
 Durga Tekdi
 Pancard Club
 Chatushrungi
 Mahesh Sanskrutik Bhavan
 Chandivali Studio
 Raj Farms
 UTI Bank
 K K Bazaar
 Patankar Bungalow
 Bhave Bungalow

Awards

Nominations
 2005 Screen Awards: Best Film (Marathi)
 2005 Screen Awards: Best Director (Marathi) – Sanjay Soorkar
 2005 Screen Awards: Best Actress (Marathi) – Beneka

Soundtrack

Tracklist
Following table shows list of tracks in the film.

References

External links
 

2004 films
Films directed by Sanjay Surkar
2000s Marathi-language films